The champions league round was the next stage from the regional stage of 2018 Thai League 4. The winners of each regions, the runners-up of some regions, and the winners of qualifying play-off would qualified to this round to finding 3 clubs promoting to 2019 Thai League 3.

Teams

Note:

Qualifying play-offs
Upper region

Lower region

Preliminary round

|-
!colspan=3|Upper region

|-
!colspan=3|Lower region

|}

Upper region

Lower region

Play-off round

|-
!colspan=3|Upper region

|-
!colspan=3|Lower region

|}

Upper region

Lower region

Group stage

Upper region

Lower region

Knockout stage
Winners, runners-up, and third place of 2018 Thai League 4 would promoted to 2019 Thai League 3.

Third place play-off

Summary

|}

Matches

North Bangkok University won 2–1 on aggregate.

Final

Summary

|}

Matches

Nakhon Pathom United won 5–4 on aggregate.

Teams promoted to 2019 Thai League 3

 Nakhon Pathom United (champions)
 Khon Kaen United (runners-up)
 North Bangkok University (Third-placed)

Goalscorers
6 goals

 Maranhão (North Bangkok University)

5 goals

 Jardel Capistrano (Khon Kaen United)
 Olveira Silva Diego (Nakhon Pathom United)
 Chamsuddeen Shoteng (Satun United)

4 goals

 João Francisco (North Bangkok University)
 Poomipat Kantanet (North Bangkok University)
 Martins Caio Henrique (Satun United)
 Natthawut Munsuwan (Satun United)

3 goals

 Chainarong Samuttha (Chanthaburi)
 Charin Buthad (Khon Kaen United)
 Chanukun Karin (North Bangkok University)
 Diop Badara Aly (Yasothon)

2 goals

 Kaikitti Inuthen (Bankhai United)
 Piya Kruawan (Bankhai United)
 Krittanon Thanachotjareanphon (Grakcu Saimai United)
 Chatchai Phithanmet (Huahin City)
 Tebnimit Buransri (Khon Kaen United)
 Nakun Phintong (Nakhon Pathom United)
 Pongsathon Tongchaum (Nakhon Pathom United)
 Pattanapong Chumchan (Yasothon)
 Vichit Singloilom (Yasothon)

1 goal

 Camara Souleymane (Bankhai United)
 Chokchai Sukthed (Bankhai United)
 Elvis Job (Bankhai United)
 Pongrawit Jantawong (BGC)
 Thammayut Rakbun (BGC)
 Ozor Enoch (Chanthaburi)
 Tripop Jaroensheep (Chanthaburi)
 Rattikun Plonghirun (Grakcu Saimai United)
 Samart Phetnoo (Grakcu Saimai United)
 Amorn Mudlied (Hatyai)
 Anon Kaimook (Huahin City)
 Panudach Subpeng (Huahin City)
 Songkran Puangnoy (Huahin City)
 Kissi Koffi Ludovic Loic (IPE Samut Sakhon United)
 Pantakan Kasemkulwirai (IPE Samut Sakhon United)
 Phethai Sa-ngiamsak (IPE Samut Sakhon United)
 Abass Ouro-Nimini (Muang Loei United)
 André Houma Ekue (Muang Loei United)
 Chawin Thirawatsri (Muang Loei United)
 Krit Phavaputanon (Muang Loei United)
 Chokchai Chuchai (Nakhon Pathom United)
 Lesley Ablorh (Nakhon Pathom United)
 Nattaphon Worasut (Nakhon Pathom United)
 Saeid Chahjouei (Nakhon Pathom United)
 Wisarut Pannasi (Nakhon Pathom United)
 Jettarin Phetborisut (Pluakdaeng Rayong United)
 Fabricio Marabá (Satun United)
 Manso Ausman (Satun United)
 Thanakorn Sathanpong (Satun United)
 Thirawat Lertpitchapatch (Satun United)
 Diarra Aboubacar Sidick (Uttaradit)
 Kritnapop Mekputcharakul (Uttaradit)
 Patipat Kamsat (Uttaradit)
 Otis Sarfo Adjei (Yasothon)

Own goal

 Tanakit Wonglikit (Bankhai United against Chanthaburi)
 Panadon Lexsuwan (Chanthaburi against Muang Loei United)
 Yongyut Jareonpoom (Chanthaburi against Muang Loei United)
 Chatchai Maneewan (Grakcu Saimai United against Pattani)

References

Thai League T4 seasons
4